Al-Qaeda in Bosnia and Herzegovina was the al-Qaeda branch based in Bosnia and Herzegovina, formed during the Bosnian War in 1992. During the Bosnian War, the group contributed volunteers to the Bosnian mujahideen (called El Mudžahid), a volunteer detachment of the Army of the Republic of Bosnia and Herzegovina. The group operated through the Saudi High Commission for Relief of Bosnia and Herzegovina (SHC).

Origins
Al-Qaeda's operations in Bosnia started in 1993 and were led by Ayman al-Zawahiri. At the onset of the Bosnian War, the then president Alija Izetbegović turned to the Islamic world for support in Bosnia's war efforts. The call for help to the Islamic world brought along with it arms, money and an influx of hundreds of foreign fighters, many of them mujahedin from Afghanistan who had fought against the Soviets. Estimated number ranges from 500 to 1,500 foreign fighters, probably around 1,000, who came to Bosnia, many of them coming from Pakistan after their government expelled former mujahedin fighters of the Afghan resistance. In addition to Afghan resistance fighters, many foreign volunteers came from Europe, with Madrid allegedly being a center for recruitment in Europe. Abu Dahdah recruited many fighters out of the Abu Bakr mosque.

It was alleged that between 1993 and 1996, al-Qaeda-leader Osama bin Laden was thought to have visited camps in the country on a Bosnian passport. According to the Germann journalist Renate Flottau, Osama bin Laden allegedly visited Bosnia and met with Izetbegović in 1993, however Marko Attila Hoare, while not dismissing possibility out of hand, question discrepancy between Flottau claims and Izetbegović's admission that he had no recollection of meeting bin Laden. Al-Qaeda, through a Vienna-based charity linked to bin Laden (Third World Relief Agency), funneled millions of dollars in contributions to the Bosnians, trained mujahedin to go and fight in Bosnia, and maintained an office in neighboring Croatia's capital Zagreb.

Conflict
Foreign mujahedin fighters during the Bosnian war served in the El Mudžahid brigade. The experience in Bosnia helped globalize a mujahedin mentality and according to one former al-Qaeda member, many talented leaders of al-Qaeda emerged from this conflict after they developed anti-Western and anti-globalization sentiment.

Aftermath
After the war, al-Qaeda reestablished its connections in Bosnia and Herzegovina through the Saudi High Commission (SHC) charity organization. The charity was formed in 1993 by the decree of King Fahd of Saudi Arabia. It acted as a "fully integrated component of al-Qa[e]da's logistical and financial support infrastructure".

In late 2001, a raid was carried out by United States Special Forces on local SHC headquarters in Ilidža, a suburb of Sarajevo. In the raid documents, including manuals on how to forge the United States Secretary of State office ID cards, as well as manuscripts and notes on meetings with Bin Laden were found. Other al-Qaeda fronts such as Vazir (successor of al-Haramain Foundation) and the Global Relief Fund were also shut down.

A Bosnian raid on al-Haramain Foundation, an organisation reportedly tied to al-Gama'at Islamiya which worked closely with al-Qaeda, uncovered tapes calling for attacks on peacekeepers in Bosnia. The Bosnian police also raided the offices of Benevolence International Foundation (BIF), finding weapons, military manuals, a fake passport and photos of Bin Laden. The evidence uncovered by Bosnian authorities on BIF's office on March 19, 2002, led to the arrests of Munib Zahiragic, the head of its Bosnian chapter, and Enaam Arnaout.

References 

Groups affiliated with al-Qaeda
Bosnian War
Paramilitary organizations in the Yugoslav Wars